Wesley University, Ondo [Formerly Wesley University of Science and Technology  (WUSTO)] is located in Ondo, Ondo State Nigeria. It was founded by the Methodist Church, Nigeria. The University was granted official license by the National Universities Commission (NUC) on May 17, 2007. Consequently, the official opening ceremony took place on May 14, 2008, at the University temporary site in Ondo town, while full academic activities commenced in October, 2008, with the admission and resumption of the University’s pioneer students.

References

External links

Christian universities and colleges in Nigeria
2007 establishments in Nigeria
Educational institutions established in 2007
Universities and colleges in Ondo State